Cardus crucifer is a species of blind deep-water decapod crustacean from the Atlantic Ocean, the only species in the genus Cardus. It differs from other members of the family Polychelidae in having only four pairs of claws, instead of five, in both sexes. The name Cardus refers to the thistle Carduus, in reference to the spiny thistle-like carapace.

References

Polychelida
Crustaceans of the Atlantic Ocean
Crustaceans described in 1873